Quzlu (also Romanized as Qūzlū and Qowzlū; also known as Kozli and Kozly) is a village in Zarjabad Rural District, Firuz District, Kowsar County, Ardabil Province, Iran. At the 2006 census, its population was 458, in 111 families.

References 

Tageo

Towns and villages in Kowsar County